The 2022 PDC Players Championship consists of 30 darts tournaments on the 2022 PDC Pro Tour.

Prize money
The prize money for the Players Championship events rose from 2021 levels, with each event having a prize fund of £100,000.

This is how the prize money is divided:

February

Players Championship 1

Players Championship 1 was contested on Saturday 5 February 2022 at the Barnsley Metrodome in Barnsley.

Players Championship 2
Players Championship 2 was contested on Sunday 6 February 2022 at the Barnsley Metrodome in Barnsley.  hit a nine-dart finish against .

Players Championship 3
Players Championship 3 was contested on Saturday 12 February 2022 at the Robin Park Sports Centre in Wigan.  hit a nine-dart finish against .

Players Championship 4
Players Championship 4 was contested on Sunday 13 February 2022 at the Robin Park Sports Centre in Wigan.

March

Players Championship 5
Players Championship 5 was contested on Saturday 19 March 2022 at the Barnsley Metrodome in Barnsley.  hit a nine-dart finish against , whilst  also did the same against .

Players Championship 6
Players Championship 6 was contested on Sunday 20 March 2022 at the Barnsley Metrodome in Barnsley.  hit a nine-dart finish against .

Players Championship 7
Players Championship 7 was contested on Saturday 26 March 2022 at the H+ Hotel in Niedernhausen.  hit a nine-dart finish against , whilst  also did the same against .

Players Championship 8
Players Championship 8 was contested on Sunday 27 March 2022 at the H+ Hotel in Niedernhausen.

April

Players Championship 9
Players Championship 9 was contested on Friday 1 April 2022 at the Barnsley Metrodome in Barnsley.  hit a nine-dart finish against .

Players Championship 10
Players Championship 10 was contested on Saturday 2 April 2022 at the Barnsley Metrodome in Barnsley.

Players Championship 11
Players Championship 11 was contested on Sunday 3 April 2022 at the Barnsley Metrodome in Barnsley.  hit a nine-dart finish against .

Players Championship 12
Players Championship 12 was contested on Saturday 9 April 2022 at the Barnsley Metrodome in Barnsley.

Players Championship 13
Players Championship 13 was contested on Sunday 10 April 2022 at the Barnsley Metrodome in Barnsley.

May

Players Championship 14
Players Championship 14 was contested on Tuesday 10 May 2022 at the Robin Park Sports Centre in Wigan.  and  hit nine-dart finishes against  and  respectively.

Players Championship 15
Players Championship 15 was contested on Wednesday 11 May 2022 at the Robin Park Sports Centre in Wigan.  and  hit nine-dart finishes against  and  respectively.

June

Players Championship 16
Players Championship 16 was contested on Tuesday 14 June 2022 at the H+ Hotel in Niedernhausen.

Players Championship 17
Players Championship 17 was contested on Wednesday 15 June 2022 at the H+ Hotel in Niedernhausen.

July

Players Championship 18
Players Championship 18 was contested on Friday 8 July 2022 at the Barnsley Metrodome in Barnsley.  hit a nine-dart finish against .

Players Championship 19
Players Championship 19 was contested on Saturday 9 July 2022 at the Barnsley Metrodome in Barnsley.

Players Championship 20
Players Championship 20 was contested on Sunday 10 July 2022 at the Barnsley Metrodome in Barnsley.  hit a nine-dart finish against .

Players Championship 21
Players Championship 21 was contested on Monday 11 July 2022 at the Barnsley Metrodome in Barnsley.

August

Players Championship 22
Players Championship 22 was contested on Wednesday 3 August 2022 at the Barnsley Metrodome in Barnsley.  and  hit nine-dart finishes against  and  respectively.

Players Championship 23
Players Championship 23 was contested on Thursday 4 August 2022 at the Barnsley Metrodome in Barnsley.  hit a nine-dart finish against .

Players Championship 24
Players Championship 24 was contested on Friday 5 August 2022 at the Barnsley Metrodome in Barnsley.  hit a nine-dart finish against .

October

Players Championship 25
Players Championship 25 was contested on Thursday 20 October 2022 at the Barnsley Metrodome in Barnsley.

Players Championship 26
Players Championship 26 was contested on Friday 21 October 2022 at the Barnsley Metrodome in Barnsley.  hit a nine-dart finish against .

Players Championship 27
Players Championship 27 was contested on Saturday 22 October 2022 at the Barnsley Metrodome in Barnsley.  hit a nine-dart finish against .

Players Championship 28
Players Championship 28 was contested on Sunday 23 October 2022 at the Barnsley Metrodome in Barnsley.

November

Players Championship 29
Players Championship 29 was contested on Friday 4 November 2022 at the Barnsley Metrodome in Barnsley.

Players Championship 30
Players Championship 30 was contested on Saturday 5 November 2022 at the Barnsley Metrodome in Barnsley.

References

2022 in darts
2022 PDC Pro Tour